Sakulinskaya is a rural locality (a village) in Cherevkovskoye Rural Settlement, Krasnoborsky District, Arkhangelsk Oblast, Russia. The population was 174 as of 2010.

Geography 
Sakulinskaya is located 40 km northwest of Krasnoborsk (the district's administrative centre) by road. Bolshaya Kletsovskaya is the nearest rural locality.

References 

Rural localities in Krasnoborsky District